The 1897 Holy Cross football team was an American football team that represented the College of the Holy Cross as an independent in the 1897 college football season.

In its second and final year under head coach Alfred C. N. Peterson, the team compiled a 4–3–1 record. E.F. Shanahan was the team captain.

Holy Cross played its home games at two off-campus fields in Worcester, Massachusetts, the Worcester Oval and the Worcester College Grounds.

Schedule

References

Holy Cross
Holy Cross Crusaders football seasons
Holy Cross football